Brachyolene brunnea is a species of beetle in the family Cerambycidae. It was described by Per Olof Christopher Aurivillius in 1914. It is known from the Central African Republic and Cameroon.

References

Tetraulaxini
Beetles described in 1914
Taxa named by Per Olof Christopher Aurivillius